Dick Oosting (born June 1946) is a Dutch human rights lawyer and activist. He headed Amnesty International's EU Office and is currently the CEO of the European Council on Foreign Relations (ECFR).

Work at Amnesty 
In the mid-1970s he coordinated Amnesty International’s first worldwide campaign against torture (an activity highlighted in Amnesty's Nobel Peace Prize citation in 1977). He then served five years as Amnesty's Deputy Secretary General and returned to the Netherlands to head its Dutch national section. From 1999 he spent eight years in Brussels leading Amnesty's EU office.

The International Center for Transitional Justice 
Dick Oosting managed the Europe programme of the International Center for Transitional Justice, managing programmes in the former Yugoslavia, Cyprus and Afghanistan. Dick has been on high level human rights missions to Africa, Asia and the Middle East.

The European Council on Foreign Relations 
He joined the European Council on Foreign Relations in 2010 and has been its CEO until 2016. He is a now a member of the Council of ECFR.

References 

1946 births
Living people
Amnesty International people
20th-century Dutch lawyers
Dutch human rights activists
Human rights lawyers
University of Groningen alumni
21st-century Dutch lawyers